Brian Sergent is a former football (soccer) player who represented New Zealand at international level.

Sergent made a solitary official international appearance for New Zealand in a 0–6 loss to Australia on 14 August 1948.

References 

Year of birth missing (living people)
Living people
New Zealand association footballers
New Zealand international footballers
Association football outside forwards